Sandro Teti Editore is an Italian publishing house that was founded in Rome in 2003.

Sandro Teti Editore published five series. Historos, run by Luciano Canfora, ZigZag, Il Teatro della Storia, I Russi e l’Italia and Immagine. 

The cultural magazine Il Calendario del Popolo, founded in 1945, is published by Sandro Teti Editore. The publisher is director of Fondazione Alferov in Italia.

References

 Mario Geymonat, Il grande Archimede, Sandro Teti Editore, Roma, 2008
 Mlecin Leonid, Perché Stalin creò Israele, Sandro Teti Editore, Roma, 2010

External links
 

Publishing companies of Italy